Talmo may refer to:

Talmo, New South Wales, a rural community in Australia
Talmo, Georgia, a town in Jackson County
Talmo, Kansas, an unincorporated community in Republic County
Talmo Oliveira (born 1969), a Brazilian volleyball player